Costache Caragiale (29 March 1815 – 13 February 1877) was a Romanian actor and theatre manager who had an important role in the development of the Romanian theatre.

Born in Bucharest, Wallachia, he made his stage debut in 1835 and, in 1838, organized a theatre company in Iaşi, Moldavia, which became part of the first Romanian National Theatre. 

He worked in many Romanian regional theatres, especially in Iaşi, Craiova and Botoşani, and encouraged the usage of plays by Romanian dramatists of the day, especially those of Vasile Alecsandri and Constantin Negruzzi. Between 1852 and 1855, Costache Caragiale was the first director of the National Theatre of Bucharest. He also wrote a few comedies, such as O repetiţie moldovenească – A Moldavian Rehearsal (1844) and O soaré la mahala (A Soiree in the Neighbourhood) in 1847.

He is the uncle of Ion Luca Caragiale, a Romanian playwright. His younger brother, Iorgu Caragiale, was also an actor and theatre director.

Works

Scrieri a lui Costache Caragiale, ("Writings by Costache Caragiale"), 1840
Epistolă către Grigore Alexandrescu, ("Letter to Grigore Alexandrescu"), 1841
Leonil sau Ce produce dispreţul, ("Leonil or What Contempt Produces"), 1841
O repetiţie moldovenească sau Noi şi iar Noi, ("A Moldavian Rehearsal or We And We Again"), 1844, comedy
O soaré la mahala sau Amestecul de dorinţi, ("A Soirée in the Low-Life Neighborhood or The Mixture of Aspirations"), comedy
Îngâmfata plăpumăreasă sau Cucoană sunt ("The Conceited Quiltmaker or A Lady I Am")
Doi coţcari sau Feriţi-vă de răi ca de foc ("Two Swindlers or Avoid the Bad Ones Like Poison")
Învierea morţilor ("The Resurrection of the Dead")
Urmarea coţcarilor ("The Swindlers, A Sequel")
Prologul pentru inaugurarea noului teatru din București, ("Prologue at the Inauguration of the New Theater in Bucharest"), (1852), 1881
Teatrul Naţional în Ţara Românească, ("The National Theater in Wallachia"), (1855), 1867

Translations
Furiosul, ("Orlando Furioso" ?), 1840

References 

1815 births
1877 deaths
Chairpersons of the National Theatre Bucharest
Romanian people of Greek descent
Theatre people from Bucharest
Romanian male stage actors
Romanian dramatists and playwrights
Romanian theatre directors
19th-century Romanian male actors
19th-century Romanian dramatists and playwrights
19th-century theatre managers